A potassium-ion battery or K-ion battery (abbreviated as KIB) is a type of battery and analogue to lithium-ion batteries, using potassium ions for charge transfer instead of lithium ions. It was invented by the Iranian/American chemist Ali Eftekhari (President of the American Nano Society) in 2004.

Prototype 
The prototype device used a potassium anode and a Prussian blue compound as the cathode material for its high electrochemical stability. The prototype was successfully used for more than 500 cycles. A recent review showed currently that several pragmatic materials have been successfully used as the anode and cathode for the new generations of potassium-ion batteries. For example, the conventional anode material graphite has been shown that it can be used as an anode in a potassium-ion battery.

Materials 
After the invention of potassium-ion battery with the prototype device, researchers have increasingly been focusing on enhancing the specific capacity and cycling performance with the application of new materials to electrode and electrolyte. A general picture of the material used for potassium-ion battery can be found as follows:

Anodes 
Same as the case of lithium-ion battery, graphite could also accommodate the intercalation of potassium within electrochemical process. Whereas with different kinetics, graphite anodes suffer from low capacity retention during cycling within potassium-ion batteries. Thus, the approach of structure engineering of graphite anode is needed to achieve stable performance. Other types of carbonaceous materials besides graphite have been employed as anode material for potassium-ion battery, such as expanded graphite, carbon nanotubes, carbon nanofibers and also nitrogen or phosphorus-doped carbon materials. Conversion anodes which can form compound with potassium ion with boosted storage capacity and reversibility have also been studied to fit for potassium-ion battery. Classic alloying anodes such as Si, Sb and Sn that can form alloy with lithium ion during cycling process are also applicable for potassium-ion battery. Among them Sb is the most promising candidate due to its low cost and the theoretical capacity up to 660 mAh g−1. Other organic compounds are also being developed to achieve strong mechanical strength as well as maintaining decent performance.

Cathodes 
Besides the original Prussian blue cathode and its analogs, researches on cathode part of potassium ion battery focus on engineering of nanostructure and solid ionics. Polyanionic compounds with inductive defects could provide the highest working voltage among other types of cathode for potassium-ion batteries. During the electrochemical cycling process, its crystal structure will be distorted to created more induced defects upon the insertion of potassium ion. Worth noting is an orthodox approach of using organic compound as cathode for potassium-ion battery, such as PTCDA, a red pigment which can bond with 11 potassium ion within single molecule.

Electrolytes 
Due to the chemical activity higher than lithium, electrolytes for potassium ion battery requires more delicate engineering to address safety concerns. Commercial ethylene carbonate (EC) and diethyl carbonate (DEC) or other traditional ether/ester liquid electrolyte showed poor cycling performance and fast capacity degradation due to the Lewis acidity of potassium, also the highly flammable feature of it has prevented further application. Ionic liquid electrolyte offers new way to expand electrochemical window of potassium ion battery with much negative redox voltage and it's especially stable with graphite anode. Recently, solid polymer electrolyte for all-solid-state potassium-ion battery have attracted much attention due to its flexibility and enhanced safety, Feng et al proposed a poly (propylene carbonate)-KFSI solid polymer electrolyte with the frame work of cellulose non-woven membrane, with boosted ionic conductivity of 1.3610−5 S cm−1. Research on electrolyte for potassium-ion battery is focusing on achieving fast ion diffusion kinetics, stable SEI formation as well as enhanced safety.

Advantages 

Along with the sodium ion, potassium-ion is the prime chemistry replacement candidate for lithium-ion batteries. The potassium-ion has certain advantages over similar lithium-ion (e.g., lithium-ion batteries): the cell design is simple and both the material and the fabrication procedures are cheaper. The key advantage is the abundance and low cost of potassium in comparison with lithium, which makes potassium batteries a promising candidate for large scale batteries such as household energy storage and electric vehicles. Another advantage of a potassium-ion battery over a lithium-ion battery is potentially faster charging.

The prototype employed a  electrolyte, though almost all common electrolyte salts can be used. In addition, ionic liquids have also recently been reported as stable electrolytes with a wide electrochemical window. Potassium batteries can accept a wide range of cathode materials which can offer rechargeability lower cost. One noticeable advantage is the availability of potassium graphite, which is used as an anode material in some lithium-ion batteries. Its stable structure guarantees a reversible intercalation/de-intercalation of potassium ions under charge/discharge.

Applications 

In 2007, Chinese company Starsway Electronics marketed the first potassium battery-powered portable media player as a high-energy device.

Potassium batteries have been proposed for large-scale energy storage given its exceptional cyclability, but current prototypes only withstand a hundred charging cycles.

As of 2019, five main issues are preventing widespread use of the K-ion battery technology: low diffusion of potassium ions through a solid electrode, as well as breakdown of the potassium after repeated cycles due to  changes in volume, side reactions, growth of dendrites and poor heat dissipation. Researchers estimate that it could take as long as 20 years to figure all these problems out.

Biological potassium battery 

The interesting and unique feature of the potassium-ion battery in comparison with other types of batteries is that life on Earth is based on biological potassium-ion batteries.  is the key charge carrier in plants. Circulation of  ions facilitates energy storage in plants by forming decentralized potassium batteries. This is not only an iconic feature of potassium-ion batteries but also indicates how important it is to understand the role of  charge carriers to understand the living mechanism of plants.

Other potassium batteries 

Researchers demonstrated a potassium-air battery with low overpotential. Its charge/discharge potential gap of about 50 mV is the lowest reported value in metal−air batteries. This provides a round-trip energy efficiency of >95%. In comparison, lithium–air batteries have a much higher overpotential of 1–1.5 V, which results in 60% round-trip efficiency.

See also 
List of battery types
Lithium–air battery
Thin film lithium-ion battery
Alkali metal-ion battery
Lithium-ion battery
Sodium-ion battery
Potassium-ion battery

References

External links 
New Battery Technology Could Provide Large-Scale Energy Storage for the Grid

Metal-ion batteries
Potassium